Hoseynabad-e Ganji (also Romanized as Ḩoseynābād-e Ganjī and Ḩoseynābād Ganjī) is a village in Qasabeh-ye Gharbi Rural District, in the Central District of Sabzevar County, Razavi Khorasan Province, Iran. At the 2006 census, its population was 369, in 102 families.

References 

Populated places in Sabzevar County